The Union nationale des centres sportifs de plein air, shortened to UCPA, is a non-profit French organization that makes outdoor sports holidays available for people of ages 18-45 (18-55 for advanced and expert courses). Formed in 1965, it is a union of government bodies, sports federations and youth associations. About 250,000 people travel with UCPA annually.

UCPA has three areas of operation:
sports holidays
recreation sports outreach
vocational training for careers in sport

UCPA is mainly located in France, but is also present in some fifty countries around the world.

References

External links 
 UCPA official website
 List of UCPA members (fr)

Non-profit organizations based in France
Sports organizations of France
Organizations based in Paris
Youth organizations based in France
Hiking organizations
1965 establishments in France
Sports organizations established in 1965
Youth organizations established in 1965